WAVK (97.7 FM) is a radio station temporarily broadcasting a sports radio format. Licensed to Marathon, Florida, USA, the station serves the Florida Keys. The station is currently owned by Robert Holladay, through licensee Florida Keys Media, LLC, and features programming from CBS Sports Radio and Fox Sports Radio.

History
The station went on the air as WDUC on 1995-03-03. On 1995-11-03, the station changed its call sign to WKTS, on 1999-09-09 to WWWK, and on 2003-10-23 to the current WAVK. The first real format of WWWK was pure dance music as "K97", before flipping to hot AC "Wave".

In August 2013, Gamma Broadcasting, LLC reached a deal to sell its Florida Keys stations (including WAVK) to Florida Keys Media, LLC (a company controlled by Robert H. Holladay). At a price of $475,000, the sale of WAVK was consummated on July 1, 2014.

On March 30, 2020, WAVK temporarily dropped its Hot AC format for Sports as 97.7 The Zone. The reason being that sister station 1600 AM WKWF is having repairs done to its transmitter and it can no longer broadcast for the time being so its format as temporarily moved here.

References

External links

AVK
Radio stations established in 1995
1995 establishments in Florida
Sports radio stations in the United States